Kedar Nath Singh was an Indian politician. He was an member of the Indian National Congress. Singh served as the Uttar Pradesh Legislative Council from the Varanasi Division Graduates Constituency in Varanasi district. Babu kedar Nath Singh, a popular Lok Sabha MP, elected from Sultanpur. He was reelected in 1971 on India congress ticket from Sultanpur district. He remained MP and member of union cabinet of Indira Gandhi. In 1984 he was reelected and remained Indian National Congress general secretary. He was elected Rajya sabha MP for six years. He is the founder of educational institutions and worked for correction of educational backwardness in Sultanpur and neighbouring districts. He compared his accomplishments with the 1947 battle of independence.
He has three sons and one daughter, Arvind Singh,[विनोद सिंह], Ashok Singh, Lt Sushma Singh.

References 

Politicians from Varanasi
Bharatiya Janata Party politicians from Uttar Pradesh
Members of the Uttar Pradesh Legislative Council
Living people
21st-century Indian politicians
Year of birth missing (living people)